Clive Brittain (born 15 December 1934) is a retired British race-horse trainer.  He started in racing as an apprentice in 1949, and became a licensed trainer from 1972 after working for Noel Murless. He trained at Carlburg Stables in Newmarket, Suffolk and sent out his final runner prior to retirement in October 2015. His best-known horse is Pebbles, winner of the 1,000 Guineas in 1984 and the Breeders' Cup Turf in 1985.

Major wins

 Great Britain
 1,000 Guineas – (2) – Pebbles (1984), Sayyedati (1993)
 2,000 Guineas – (1) – Mystiko (1991)
 Champion Stakes – (1) – Pebbles (1985)
 Cheveley Park Stakes – (1) – Sayyedati (1992)
 Coronation Cup – (2) – Warrsan (2003, 2004)
 Coronation Stakes – (2) – Crimplene (2000), Rizeena (2014)
 Eclipse Stakes – (1) – Pebbles (1985)
 Falmouth Stakes – (2) – Gussy Marlowe (1992), Rajeem (2006)
 Fillies' Mile – (3) – Ivanka (1992), Teggiano (1999), Hibaayeb (2009)
 International Stakes – (1) – Terimon (1991)
 Nassau Stakes – (1) – Crimplene (2000)
 Oaks – (1) – User Friendly (1992)
 Queen Anne Stakes – (3) – Radetzky (1978), Sikeston (1991), Alflora (1993)
 Queen Elizabeth II Stakes – (1) – Air Express (1997)
 St. James's Palace Stakes – (2) – Averof (1974), Radetzky (1976) 
 St. Leger – (2) – Julio Mariner (1978), User Friendly (1992)
 Sun Chariot Stakes – (1) – Warning Shadows (1995)
 Sussex Stakes – (1) – Sayyedati (1995)
 Yorkshire Oaks – (1) – User Friendly (1992)

 France
 Grand Prix de Saint-Cloud – (1) – User Friendly (1993)
 Prix de l'Abbaye de Longchamp – (1) – Var (2004)
 Prix Jacques Le Marois – (1) – Sayyedati (1993)
 Prix Jean Prat – (1) – Lapierre (1988)

 Germany
 Deutschland-Preis – (1) – Luso (1997)
 Grosser Preis von Baden – (2) – Warrsan (2004, 2005)
 Rheinland-Pokal – (2) – Luso (1996, 1998)

 Hong Kong
 Hong Kong Vase – (2) – Luso (1996, 1997)

 Ireland
 Irish 1,000 Guineas – (1) – Crimplene (2000)
 Irish Oaks – (1) – User Friendly (1992)
 Moyglare Stud Stakes – (2) – Sayyedati (1992), Rizeena (2013)
 Pretty Polly Stakes – (1) – Game Plan (1990) 

 Italy
 Derby Italiano – (2) – Hailsham (1991), Luso (1995)
 Oaks d'Italia – (1) – Menhoubah (2004)
 Premio Parioli – (1) – Air Express (1997)
 Premio Presidente della Repubblica – (2) – Sikeston (1991, 1992)
 Premio Regina Elena – (1) – Love of Dubai (2008)
 Premio Roma – (1) – Sikeston (1991)
 Premio Vittorio di Capua – (2) – Sikeston (1990, 1991)

 Japan
 Japan Cup – (1) – Jupiter Island (1986)

 United States
 Breeders' Cup Turf – (1) – Pebbles (1985)

References

External links
Clive Brittain at BritishHorseRacing.com
Clive Brittain at NationalThoroughbredRacingAssociation.com

1934 births
British racehorse trainers
Living people